Rupea (Transylvanian Saxon: Räppes;) is a town in Brașov County in Transylvania, Romania. It administers one village, Fișer (Schweischer; Sövénység), which has a fortified church. Older Romanian names for the settlement include Cohalm and Holuma. At the 2011 census, 71.6% of inhabitants were Romanians, 19.5% Hungarians, 7.1% Roma, and 1.7% Germans (more specifically Transylvanian Saxons).

Climate 

Rupea has a humid continental climate (Cfb in the Köppen climate classification).

See also

 Battle of Kőhalom
 Rupea Citadel

References 

 

Populated places in Brașov County
Localities in Transylvania
Towns in Romania